Rex A. Terry (February 21, 1888 – July 13, 1964) was a banker and politician in the United States state of South Dakota. He served as a member of the South Dakota State Senate and as Lieutenant Governor of South Dakota.

Early life and education
Terry was born at Sturgis, Dakota Territory in 1888. After attending public schools and business college, Terry worked in retail in Fort Pierre, South Dakota, where he also acted as president of the Fort Pierre Commercial Club along with managing the Fort Pierre National Bank. He had also been a commissioner of Fort Pierre.

Political career
Terry was elected to the South Dakota Senate as a Republican in 1941 to represent the 29th district (Stanley County). He served until 1948. He served as Lieutenant Governor from 1949 to 1955, under Governors George T. Mickelson and Sigurd Anderson.

Personal life
In 1953, Terry escaped a two-car accident, sustaining minor injuries, between Pierre and Fort Pierre that left his car "almost a total wreck".<ref>"Lt. Gov. Terry Only Bruised In Two Car Crash, The Daily Republic, Saturday, July 25, 1953, Mitchell, South Dakota, United States Of America</ref>

He married Delia Campbell in 1916. Terry was active within the South Dakota Masons, serving as Grand Master from 1944 to 1945. He had previously served as a Deputy Grand Master prior to his promotion to Grand Master in 1944.

Death and legacy
He died in 1964 at a hospital in Pierre. He was buried at Scotty Phillips National Cemetery after a service at the masonic temple in Pierre. Upon his death, The Sioux Falls Argus-Leader'' lauded Terry's accomplishments, stating that his career "exemplified the best in American citizenship and the South Dakota way of life.".

References

1888 births
1964 deaths
People from Fort Pierre, South Dakota
South Dakota state senators
Lieutenant Governors of South Dakota
20th-century American politicians
People from Sturgis, South Dakota